Robert Urbain (24 November 1930 – 9 November 2018) was a Belgian politician who served as Minister of State from 1998.

References

1930 births
2018 deaths
Belgian politicians
Postal services ministers of Belgium
Trade ministers of Belgium